Alibey is a neighborhood of Silivri district in Istanbul Province, Turkey. It is situated southeast of the city center, bordered by the highway D-100 in the north. As of 2019, the population of the neighborhood is 18,114.

The neighborhood takes its name from a no more existing Alibey Mosque. The historic mosque in Silivri was destroyed by the invading Bulgarian troops of the Principality of Bulgaria during the Russo-Turkish War (1877–1878).

Public buildings and places in Alibey are: the Silivri Municipality central service buildings (Turgut Özal Blvd.), the courthouse (Turgut Özal Blvd.), the headquarters of Silivri district Gendarmerie (Çetin St.), and the Silvri Cemetery (Akgün Silivri St.).

Population
As of 2019, 9,160 (50.6%) female and 8,954 (49.4%) male people live in Alibey.

Education
Six schools are located in Alibey, which are:

Public schools
 Piri Mehmet Paşa İlkokulu (Primary school)
 Gazi İmam Hatip Ortaokulu (Secondary İmam Hatip school)
 Silivri Ortaokulu (Secondary school)
 Silivri Anadolu Lisesi (Anatolian High School)

Private schools
 Özel Mektebim Koleji Silivri Fen Lisesi (Science high school)
 Özel Silivri Sınav Koleji Anadolu Lisesi (Anatolian High School)

Sport
The women's football club Alibeyspor competes in the Turkish Women's Third League.

Health care
The private hospital Silivri Özel Kolan Hastanesi (Turgut Özal Blvd.) is situated in ALibey.

References

External links

Populated places in Istanbul Province
Neighbourhoods of Silivri